The men's 1500 metres was an event at the 1992 Summer Olympics in Barcelona, Spain. There were a total number of 51 participating athletes from 40 nations, with four qualifying heats. The maximum number of athletes per nation had been set at 3 since the 1930 Olympic Congress. The event was held from 3 August to 8 August 1992. The event was won by Fermín Cacho of Spain, the nation's first title in the men's 1500 metres. Morocco won its first medal in the event with Rachid El Basir's silver. Qatar won its first Olympic medal in any event with Mohamed Suleiman's bronze.

Summary

Most of the eyes were on reigning world champion Noureddine Morceli, who hovered in the middle of the pack, while Joseph Chesire led most of the race, marked by Jens-Peter Herold through a slow race of 62.25 and 64.58 for the first two laps, setting up a fast finish.  A step behind the leaders, as the pace quickened going into the final lap, home team favorite Fermín Cacho who had been strategically watching the field, pushed the final backstretch to move up on Chesire.  Passing on the inside with just over 200 to go, Cacho accelerated and was surprised Chesire was not able to mount a challenge.  Charging out into a big lead around the turn, Cacho kept looking back for the next challenger, but there was none, Cacho and the Spanish fans celebrated.  Even with his celebrating and looking back, Cacho's last lap was about 50.5.  Mohamed Suleiman edged past a fading Chesire and a final sprint around the outside from eighth place netted Rachid El Basir the silver.  Suleiman earned the first Olympic medal for Qatar.

Background

This was the 22nd appearance of the event, which is one of 12 athletics events to have been held at every Summer Olympics. Four finalists from 1988 returned: bronze medalist Jens-Peter Herold of East Germany (now Germany), eighth-place finisher Marcus O'Sullivan of Ireland, ninth-place finisher Mário Silva of Portugal, and eleventh-place finisher Joseph Chesire of Kenya. The favorite was Noureddine Morceli of Algeria, who had recently won the first of what would be three consecutive world championships.

Belize, the Central African Republic, Croatia, Guinea, Laos, Lebanon, Swaziland, Vanuatu, unified Yemen (North Yemen had competed previously), and Zaire each made their first appearance in the event; the Unified Team of some former Soviet republics competed in this event in the team's only Summer Games appearance. The United States made its 21st appearance, most of all nations (having missed only the boycotted 1980 Games).

Competition format

The competition was again three rounds (used previously in 1952 and since 1964). The "fastest loser" system introduced in 1964 was used for both the first round and semifinals. The 12-man semifinals and finals introduced in 1984 were used (abandoning the short-lived 13-runner semifinal heats from 1988, though one semifinal ended up having 13 anyway).

There were four heats in the first round, each with 12 or 13 runners. The top five runners in each heat, along with the next four fastest overall, advanced to the semifinals. The 24 semifinalists were divided into two semifinals, each with 12 runners. Momodou Bello N'Jie of The Gambia was placed directly in a semifinal, making a 13th runner in that semifinal. The top five men in each semifinal, plus the next two fastest overall, advanced to the 12-man final.

Records

These were the standing world and Olympic records prior to the 1992 Summer Olympics.

No new world or Olympic records were set during the competition. The following national records were established during the competition:

Schedule

All times are Central European Summer Time (UTC+2)

Results

Round 1

Heat 1

Heat 2

Heat 3

Heat 4

Semifinals

Semifinal 1

Semifinal 2

Final

The final was held on August 8, 1992.

See also
 1990 Men's European Championships 1500 metres (Split)
 1991 Men's World Championships 1500 metres (Tokyo)
 1993 Men's World Championships 1500 metres (Stuttgart)
 1994 Men's European Championships 1500 metres (Helsinki)

References

External links
 Official Report
 Results

 
1500 metres at the Olympics
Men's events at the 1992 Summer Olympics